"Demons" is a song by English big beat musician Fatboy Slim, featuring Grammy Award-winning American R&B-soul singer Macy Gray. The song was released as a single from Slim's 2000 album Halfway Between the Gutter and the Stars, and later appeared on Gray's 2004 greatest hits compilation The Very Best of Macy Gray as well as Slim's 2006 greatest hits compilation The Greatest Hits - Why Try Harder. It contains elements of Bill Withers' 1973 song "I Can't Write Left-Handed". The gospel group The Blind Boys of Alabama covered the song on their 2005 album Atom Bomb. Recently, the song was featured in the Netflix series Sense8.

Music video 

The DVD single includes the "Demons" music video (with multiple angles), a "making-of" featuring an interview with Macy Gray, and a TV spot for the album. The video portrays a miniature man trying to rescue a woman being caught in the menacing metallic jaws of a piano in a cathedral. There are also intercut shots of Macy Gray performing the song herself in the sanctuary.

Track listing 

 UK 12"

 "Demons" (featuring Macy Gray)
 "The Pimp"
 "Camber Sands"

Charts

References 

2000 songs
2001 singles
Fatboy Slim songs
Macy Gray songs
Songs written by Norman Cook
Songs written by Bill Withers
Songs written by Macy Gray
Astralwerks singles
Skint Records singles